Josef Korčák's, Ladislav Adamec's, František Pitra's and Petr Pithart's Cabinet was in power from 18 June 1986 to 29 June 1990.

Government ministers

References

Czech government cabinets
Civic Forum
KDU-ČSL
Coalition governments of the Czech Republic
Communist Party of Czechoslovakia
Czech National Social Party